Sambo competitions at the 2019 Southeast Asian Games were held at the AUF Sports and Cultural Center, Angeles City, Philippines between 5 and 6 December 2019.

Medal table

Medalists

Sport

Combat

Team

References

External links
 

2019 Southeast Asian Games events